Pitcher's Pond Golf Course is a public golf course located on the Avalon Peninsula in Whiteway, Newfoundland, Canada.

History
Pitcher's Pond comprises a 9-hole course that is laid out on the hills overlooking Trinity Bay and adjacent to Pitcher's Pond. The course was opened in 2005, making it one of Newfoundland's recent golf courses.

See also
List of golf courses in Newfoundland and Labrador

References

External links
Official website

Golf clubs and courses in Newfoundland and Labrador